The Stazione Sperimentale per le Industrie degli Oli e dei Grassi (SSOG) (Oils and Fats Experimental Station) is a special Agency of the Chamber of Commerce in Milan.
It is an Institute for applied research, established in Milan in 1904, and operating on a national scale with the specific aim of promoting the technical and technological progress in the  oils, fats and derived products industry. In 1999 SSOG was transformed into a public economic institution with important legal, operational and administrative modifications which, however, have left its mission and functions unchanged.

See also
 Stazione Sperimentale per i Combustibili
 Stazione Sperimentale per la Seta
 Stazione Sperimentale Carta, Cartoni e Paste per Carta
Stazione Sperimentale per l'Industria delle Pelli e delle Materie Concianti

References

External links
 Homepage of the SSOG

Experimental Stations for Industry in Italy
Economy of Milan